The Zenn is a river of Bavaria, Germany. It is a tributary of the Regnitz, into which it flows near Vach.

See also
List of rivers of Bavaria

References 

Rivers of Bavaria
Rivers of Germany